Joe Rugolo (born 2 September 1965) is a former Australian rules footballer who played for Melbourne in the Victorian Football League (VFL) during the 1980s.

Rugolo was an Assumption College recruit and spent three seasons with Melbourne. His brother Frank was on the Melbourne list at the same time but they never played a game together.

A ruckman, Rugolo played with Sandringham after leaving Melbourne. In 1992, a premiership year, he won a J. J. Liston Trophy, having narrowly missed out on it the previous two seasons. Rugolo finished the year with a Norm Goss Memorial Medal winning performance in the Grand Final win.

References

Holmesby, Russell and Main, Jim (2007). The Encyclopedia of AFL Footballers. 7th ed. Melbourne: Bas Publishing.

1965 births
Living people
Melbourne Football Club players
Sandringham Football Club players
J. J. Liston Trophy winners
Australian rules footballers from Victoria (Australia)